The 2023 season will be Kuching City's eighth year in existence and their first season in the top flight. The club are participating in the Malaysia Super League, Malaysia FA Cup and Malaysia Cup.

The club won 2–1 over Kelantan in their first 2023 Malaysia Super League match.

Players

First-team squad

Transfers in

Transfers out

Pre-season and friendlies

Competitions

Malaysia Super League

Malaysia FA Cup

Squad statistics

Appearances and goals

Players listed with no appearances have been in the matchday squad but only as unused substitutes.

|-
! colspan=14 style=background:#dcdcdc; text-align:center| Goalkeepers

|-
! colspan=14 style=background:#dcdcdc; text-align:center| Defenders

|-
! colspan=14 style=background:#dcdcdc; text-align:center| Midfielders

|-
! colspan=14 style=background:#dcdcdc; text-align:center| Forwards

|-
! colspan=14 style=background:#dcdcdc; text-align:center|Out on Loan
|-
! colspan=14 style=background:#dcdcdc; text-align:center|Left the Club during the Season
|-

References

Kuching City
Kuching City F.C.
2023